is a Japanese voice actress.

Her most notable roles include the eponymous protagonist of the Klonoa series, Sergeant Keroro in Sgt. Frog, Shippō in InuYasha, Mother in Atashin'chi, and Regina in DokiDoki! PreCure. She married Kōji Tsujitani in 2012.

Filmography

Anime

Video games

Audio dramas

Dubbing roles

Tokusatsu

References

External links
  
 Kumiko Watanabe at Seiyuu.Info
 

1965 births
Living people
Voice actresses from Chiba Prefecture
Japanese video game actresses
Japanese voice actresses
20th-century Japanese actresses
21st-century Japanese actresses
Arts Vision voice actors
Sigma Seven voice actors